François Mansart (23 January 1598 – 23 September 1666) was a French architect credited with introducing classicism into Baroque architecture of France. The Encyclopædia Britannica cites him as the most accomplished of 17th-century French architects whose works "are renowned for their high degree of refinement, subtlety, and elegance".

Mansart, as he is generally known, popularized the mansard roof, a four-sided, double slope gambrel roof punctuated with windows on the steeper lower slope which created additional habitable space in the garrets.

Career 
François Mansart was born to a master carpenter in Paris. He was not trained as an architect; his relatives helped train him in as a stonemason and a sculptor. He is thought to have learned the skills of architect in the studio of Salomon de Brosse, the most popular architect of Henry IV's reign.

Mansart was highly recognized from the 1620s onward for his style and skill as an architect, but he was viewed as a stubborn and difficult perfectionist, tearing down his structures in order to start building them over again. Only the richest could afford to have him work for them, as Mansart's constructions cost "more money than the Great Turk himself possesses".

The only surviving example of his early work is the Château de Balleroy, commissioned by a chancellor to Gaston, Duke of Orléans, and started in 1626. The duke himself was so pleased with the result that he invited Mansart to renovate his Château de Blois (1635). The architect intended to rebuild this former royal residence completely, but his design was stymied and only the north wing was reconstructed to Mansart's design, cleverly using classical orders. In 1632, Mansart designed the Church of St. Mary of the Angels using the Pantheon as an inspiration.

Most of Mansart's buildings were subsequently reconstructed or demolished. The best preserved example of his mature style is the Château de Maisons, which uniquely retains the original interior decoration, including a magnificent staircase. The structure is strictly symmetrical, with much attention given to relief. It is thought to have heralded and inspired the 18th-century Neoclassicism.

In the 1640s, Mansart worked on the convent and church of the Val-de-Grâce in Paris, a much coveted commission from Anne of Austria. His alleged profligacy led to his being replaced with a more tractable architect, who basically followed Mansart's design.

In the 1650s, Mansart was targeted by political enemies of the prime minister Cardinal Mazarin, for whom Mansart frequently worked. In 1651, they published "La Mansarade", a pamphlet accusing the architect of wild extravagance and machinations.

After Louis XIV's accession to the throne, Mansart lost many of his commissions to other architects. His designs for the remodeling of Louvre and for the royal mausoleum at Saint-Denis were never executed, in the case of the Louvre because he would not submit detailed plans. Some of his plans were subsequently reused by his grandnephew, Jules Hardouin Mansart. Mansart died in Paris in 1666.

Gallery

References

Further reading

 Braham, Allan; Smith, Peter (1973). François Mansart. London: A. Zwemmer. .
 

17th-century French architects
French Baroque architects
1598 births
Architects from Paris
1666 deaths